Spain competed at the 2013 Mediterranean Games in Mersin, Turkey from the 20th to 30 June 2013.

Archery 

Men

Women

Athletics 

Men
Track & road events

Field events

Women
Track & road events

Field events

Badminton

Bocce 

Lyonnaise

Pétanque

Boxing 

Men

Canoeing 

Men

Women

Legend: FA = Qualify to final (medal); FB = Qualify to final B (non-medal)

Cycling

Fencing 

Men

Women

Gymnastics

Artistic 

Men
Team

Individual

Apparatus

Women

Apparatus

Rhythmic

Handball

Women's tournament

Team

Vanessa Amorós
Alexandrina Barbosa
Nuria Benzal
Raquel Caño
Elisabet Chávez
Naiara Egozkue
Patricia Elorza
Beatriz Escribano
Cristina González
Lara González
Mireya González
Ainhoa Hernández
Marta López
Ana Isabel Martínez
María Muñoz
Haridian Rodríguez

Group B

5th-6th place

Judo 

Men

Women

Karate 

Men

Women

Rowing 

Men

Sailing 

Men

Women

Shooting 

Men

Women

Swimming 

Men

Women

Table tennis 

Men

Women

Taekwondo

Men

Women

Tennis 

Men

Women

Volleyball

Beach 

Men

Women

Water polo

Men's tournament

Team 

Iñaki Aguilar
Ricard Alarcón
Daniel Cercols
Rubén de Lera
Albert Español
Joel Esteller
Pere Estrany
Francisco Fernández
Xavier García
Daniel López
Blai Mallarach
Guillermo Molina
Xavier Vallés

Group A

Semifinals

Final

Water skiing 

Men

Women

Weightlifting 

Men

Women

Wrestling

Men's Freestyle

Men's Greco-Roman

Women's Freestyle

References

Nations at the 2013 Mediterranean Games
2013
Mediterranean Games